Ernest A. Smith, known as Ernie Smith, (1951–18 August 2021) was a Jamaican Labour Party politician.

Personal life 
His daughter Marsha Smith was elected in Saint Ann North Eastern in 2020. He survived a near fatal car crash in early 2021 and died from cancer at University Hospital of the West Indies in August 2021.

References 

1951 births
2021 deaths
Deaths from cancer in Jamaica
21st-century Jamaican politicians
Members of the House of Representatives of Jamaica
Jamaica Labour Party politicians
People from Saint Ann Parish